When in Rome is the self-titled debut album of English dance group When in Rome. It is the only studio album by the original lineup to date.

Released in 1988, the album contained the song "The Promise", which was the group's biggest hit. The album peaked at #84 on the Billboard 200.

Background
In a 1988 interview with the Evening Times, keyboardist Michael Floreale spoke of the album, "Ben Rogan was great to work with - his ideas on the backing tracks were quite complementary to our own. The songs are the best from our first couple of years, so whenever the album comes out they should still stand up as songs. We just want to be able to sell enough copies of our first album to be offered the chance to do another one."

Critical reception

On its release, Curt Anderson of the Daily Union considered When in Rome to "sound like a lot of today's pop music: synthesizer-based, danceable and rather empty-headed". They added, "The two singers harmonize perfectly, singing lead vocals together on nearly every tune. The music is generally bright and perky, sort of what the Pet Shop Boys probably sound like when they've had too much coffee. Most of the record thumps along in this vein, although on Side 2 there is a greater reliance on real instruments that makes things more interesting." In a retrospective review, William Cooper of AllMusic concluded, "Like many one-hit wonders of the '80s, When in Rome failed to maintain the momentum set by its only hit song by releasing a dud of an album. 'The Promise' starts things off nicely, but the remainder of the album is embarrassingly weak."

Track listing
All songs composed by When in Rome (Clive Farrington, Michael Floreale, Andrew Mann).
"The Promise" - 3:40 	
"Heaven Knows" - 3:56 	
"Something Going On" - 3:35 	
"I Can't Stop" - 3:44 	
"If Only" - 4:08 	
"Sight of Your Tears" - 3:34 	
"Wide, Wide Sea" - 4:05 	
"Child's Play" - 4:00 	
"Total Devotion" - 3:05 	
"Everything" - 4:00

The UK CD release also included "Big City" as track 6, and "Whatever the Weather" as track 11, displacing the list accordingly.

Personnel

When in Rome
Clive Farrington: Vocals
Andrew Mann: Vocals
Michael Floreale: Keyboards, piano, backing vocals

Additional personnel
Maxi Anderson, Rose Stone: Backing Vocals
J.J. Belle, Michael Thompson: Guitars
Phil Spalding: Bass
Richard James Burgess, Mike Timoney: Keyboards
David Ervin: Keyboards, Drum Programming
Preston Heyman: Drums
Martin Ditcham, Robin Jones: Percussion
Tony Charles: Steel Drums
Mark Chandler, Richard Edwards, Kevin Robinson: Brass
Ian Gardiner: Brass Arrangements
Nick Ingman: String Arrangements
Larry Stabbins: Saxophone

Production
Produced By Michael Brauer & Ben Rogan
Engineers: Chris Fuhrman, Teri Reed
Assistant Engineers: Martin Horenburg, Alex Rodriquez
Mixing: Michael Bauer
Mastering: Tom Baker, Dan Hersch

Charts

References

1988 debut albums
When in Rome (band) albums
Virgin Records albums